The European Northern Observatory (ENO) is the name by which the Instituto de Astrofísica de Canarias and its observatories (the Teide Observatory on Tenerife and the Roque de los Muchachos Observatory on La Palma) are collectively known. Its name is a word play on the successful collaboration of the member countries in the European Southern Observatory organisation.

See also 
 European Southern Observatory

References

External links 
 ENO

Astronomical observatories in the Canary Islands
Astronomy in Europe
Astronomy institutes and departments